Delpuech is a surname. Notable people with the surname include: 

Michel Delpuech, French civil servant
Vincent Delpuech (1888-1966), French journalist and politician

See also 
 Delpech